Dong Xiaojun (born November 1962) is a Chinese diplomat. He has served as the Chinese ambassador extraordinary and plenipotentiary to Jamaica, Uruguay, and Bulgaria.

See also 
 China–Jamaica relations
 China–Uruguay relations
 Bulgaria–China relations

References

External links 

Living people
Ambassadors of China to Jamaica
Ambassadors of China to Uruguay
Ambassadors of China to Bulgaria
1962 births